Maryland House of Delegates District 3B is one of the 67 districts that compose the Maryland House of Delegates. Along with subdistrict 3A, it makes up the 3rd district of the Maryland Senate. District 3B includes part of Frederick County and is represented by one delegate.

Demographic characteristics
As of the 2020 United States census, the district had a population of 49,737, of whom 37,704 (75.8%) were of voting age. The racial makeup of the district was 32,427 (65.2%) White, 6,156 (12.4%) African American, 227 (0.5%) Native American, 3,328 (6.7%) Asian, 21 (0.0%) Pacific Islander, 2,600 (5.2%) from some other race, and 4,964 (10.0%) from two or more races. Hispanic or Latino of any race were 6,097 (12.3%) of the population.

The district had 34,678 registered voters as of October 17, 2020, of whom 8,145 (23.5%) were registered as unaffiliated, 11,791 (34.0%) were registered as Republicans, 14,373 (41.4%) were registered as Democrats, and 128 (0.4%) were registered to other parties.

Past Election Results

1982

2002

2006

2010

2014

2018

References

3B